The 2005 Atlantic 10 men's basketball tournament was played from March 9 to March 12, 2005, at U.S. Bank Arena in Cincinnati, Ohio.  The winner was named champion of the Atlantic 10 Conference and received an automatic bid to the 2005 NCAA Men's Division I Basketball Tournament.  George Washington won the tournament. The top two teams in each division received first-round byes. George Washington earned the conference's only bid to the NCAA tournament.

Bracket

All games played at U.S. Bank Arena in Cincinnati.* - Overtime

Atlantic 10 men's basketball tournament
Tournament
Atlantic 10 men's basketball tournament
Atlantic 10 men's basketball tournament
Basketball competitions in Cincinnati
College sports tournaments in Ohio
2000s in Cincinnati